Marian Elizabeth Hobson Jeanneret,  (née Hobson; born 10 November 1941) is a British scholar of French philosophy, and culture. From 1992 to 2005, she was Professor of French at Queen Mary, University of London. She had previously taught at the University of Warwick, the University of Geneva, and the University of Cambridge. In 1977, she became the first woman to be elected a Fellow of Trinity College, Cambridge.

Early life and education
Hobson was born on 10 November 1941 to Charles Hobson, a fitter at Neasden Power station till 1945. Then a Labour Party politician and Member of Parliament who was made a life peer in 1964 as Baron Hobson, and his wife Doris Mary Hobson (née Spink). She studied at Newnham College, Cambridge, graduating with Bachelor of Arts (BA) and Doctor of Philosophy (PhD) degrees: as per tradition, her BA was promoted to a Master of Arts (MA Cantab) degree. Her doctoral thesis, which she submitted in 1969, was titled "The concept of 'illusion' in French XVIIIth century aesthetic theory".

Academic career
From 1966 to 1971, Hobson was an assistant lecturer in French at the University of Warwick. From 1973 or 1974 to 1976, she was a maître-assistante (assistant professor) at the University of Geneva. In 1977, she joined the University of Cambridge having been elected a Fellow of Trinity College, Cambridge: she was the first woman to become a Fellow of Trinity College. She was additionally a university lecturer between 1985 and 1992. Then, in 1992, she moved to Queen Mary, University of London (QMUL) having been appointed Professor of French. In 2005, she retired and was appointed Emerita Professor, although she continues some work at QMUL as a professorial research fellow.

Hobson has held a number of visiting professorships: University of California (1990), Johns Hopkins University (1995 and 2005), University of Paris (1997), and Harvard University (2007).  She was the Norman Eugene Freehling Visiting Professor at the University of Michigan for the 2005/2006 academic year. From 2009 to 2012, she was a Member of the Council of the British Academy.

Personal life
In 1968, Hobson married Michel Jeanneret. Jeanneret is a Swiss scholar of French literature. Together they had one son.

Honours
In 1997, Hobson was appointed a Chevalier of the Ordre des Palmes Académiques by the French Government. In 1999 Hobson was elected a Fellow of the British Academy (FBA), the United Kingdom's national academy for the humanities and social sciences. In the 2002 Queen's Birthday Honours, she was appointed a Commander of the Order of the British Empire (CBE) for services to French language and literature.

Selected works

References

1941 births
Living people
Scholars of French literature
British women academics
Fellows of the British Academy
Commanders of the Order of the British Empire
Daughters of life peers
British literary critics
British women literary critics
Academics of the University of Warwick
Academic staff of the University of Geneva
Fellows of Trinity College, Cambridge
Alumni of Newnham College, Cambridge
British historians of philosophy
Chevaliers of the Ordre des Palmes Académiques
British women historians